Spartin may refer to:

 Peloursin, a grape variety
 A human protein encoded by the SPG20 gene